"Everything Must Go" is a song by Welsh alternative rock band Manic Street Preachers, released as the second single from their fourth studio album, Everything Must Go (1996), on 22 July 1996. The song reached number five on the UK Singles Chart.

Background
The song is cited by Wire as a message to the fans, saying that the music had changed after the loss of Richey Edwards, but the band is still the same. Ushering in a new era for the band, Wire's lyrics asks fans to forgive them for changing: "and I just hope that you can forgive us, but everything must go".

James Dean Bradfield has said that Sean Moore had a lot of freedom in the drums for his song. Unlike on several previous Manic Street Preachers singles, the drums are not "compressed", they are more open and free, giving a sense of disorder in the song. The song features a prominent string section that commentators such as Q magazine's Tom Doyle have compared to the songs of Phil Spector and his Wall of Sound.

Release
It reached number five on the UK Singles Chart on 3 August 1996, making it their second straight top-ten hit. In Finland the song reached number 18.

The CD release included "Black Garden", "Hanging On" and "No One Knows What It's Like to Be Me" whereas the cassette featured a live version of "Raindrops Keep Fallin' on My Head".

An acoustic version of the song appears on the cassette single of "Kevin Carter" released on 30 September 1996.

The Chemical Brothers' remix of the song appeared in the intro movie to the American and European versions of the PlayStation game Gran Turismo. The song also made an appearance on Forever Delayed, the band's greatest hits album released in November 2002.

Track listings
All music was composed by James Dean Bradfield and Sean Moore except where indicated. All lyrics were written by Nicky Wire except where indicated.

UK CD1
 "Everything Must Go"
 "Black Garden"
 "Hanging On"
 "No-One Knows What It's Like to Be Me"

UK CD2
 "Everything Must Go"
 "Everything Must Go" (The Chemical Brothers Remix)
 "Everything Must Go" (Stealth Sonic Orchestra Remix)
 "Everything Must Go" (Stealth Sonic Orchestra Soundtrack)

UK cassette single
 "Everything Must Go"
 "Raindrops Keep Fallin' on My Head" (live acoustic version) 

Australian CD single
 "Everything Must Go"
 "Black Garden"
 "Hanging On"
 "No-One Knows What It's Like to Be Me"
 "Everything Must Go" (Stealth Sonic Orchestra Remix)

Charts

References

Sources
 

1996 singles
1996 songs
Epic Records singles
Manic Street Preachers songs
Song recordings produced by Mike Hedges
Songs written by James Dean Bradfield
Songs written by Nicky Wire
Songs written by Sean Moore (musician)
Song recordings with Wall of Sound arrangements